Hébécourt is the name of the following communes in France:

 Hébécourt, Eure, in the Eure department
 Hébécourt, Somme, in the Somme department